Denunciation (from Latin denuntiare, "to denounce") is the act of publicly assigning to a person the blame for a perceived wrongdoing, with the hope of bringing attention to it.
Notably, centralized social control in authoritarian states requires some level of cooperation from the populace. The following two forms of cooperation occur: first, authorities actively use incentives to elicit denunciations from the populace, either through coercion or through the promise of  rewards. Second, authorities passively gain access to political negative networks, as individuals denounce to harm others whom they dislike and to gain relative to them. Paradoxically, social control is most effective when authorities provide individuals maximum freedom to direct its coercive power. The most famous informer in western cultural history is Judas  - according to the New Testament, Judas, one of the twelve disciples of Jesus of Nazareth,  betrayed Jesus, making his arrest and his subsequent delivery to the  Romans possible. 

Commonly, denunciation is justified by proponents because it allegedly leads to a better society by reducing or discouraging crime. The punishment of the denounced person is said to be justified because the convicted criminal is morally deserving of punishment. Yet, this reasoning does not present a compelling argument for society's right to inflict punishment on a specific individual. Society may recognize a crime's impact on law-abiding society, but traditional punishment theories do not even attempt to deal with punishment's effect on law-abiding society. Just as punishment may impact potential lawbreakers, it may also impact those who abide by the law. To fully understand society's right to inflict punishment, one must recognize punishment's full impact on all segments of society, not just on potential lawbreakers.

History 
Athenian democracy used the process of ostracism to allow popular anonymous denunciations.

In the context of dictatorships such as the Soviet Union, the GDR or the Third Reich, a distinction must be made between denunciation and justified reporting. According to a common understanding, a person who, in order to avert dangers to the general public or a part of it, points out a grievance to offices, authorities or renowned media, does not classify as an informer. Instead, the term "whistleblower" has been applied by more approving sources to such people since the mid-20th century. The US-American Edward Snowden (former member of the  CIA) and the Russian Grigory Rodchenkov (former director of the  Moscow Anti-Doping Center who became a whistleblower on  doping practices in Russia) are two famous recent examples.

See also
 Denunciation (penology)
 Delator
 Stop Snitchin'
 Witch hunt
Yiku sitian

References

Further reading
 Bergemann, Patrick (2017),   Denunciation and Social Control, American Sociological Review,  vol. 82, issue 2, 2017, first online, February 1, 2017 

 Lucas, Colin (2017): The Theory and Practice of Denunciation in the French Revolution. The Journal of Modern History, vol. 68 (4), pp. 768-785, first online, December 4, 1996

Human behavior